KGRK (98.5 FM) is a radio station broadcasting a classic hits format. Licensed to Glenrock, Wyoming, United States, the station serves the Casper area.  The station is currently owned by Cochise Broadcasting LLC.
Along with broadcasting classic hits, the station also has more variety in its formatting. It carries some contemporary hits, along with songs from the 70s through the 2000s. The station features no commercials, but has radio personalities.

History
The station went on the air as KGRK on October 10, 1997.

References

External links

GRK
Radio stations established in 1997